Hans Bornemann (active from 1448 - d. 1474) was a late Gothic painter who was active in Hamburg. The earliest written mention of him is a record that he received an inheritance in 1448. He was one of the founders  of the Guild of Saint Luke in Hamburg. He was active in the city council of Hamburg, and painted 17 portraits of princes for the Hamburg city hall. After his death his workshop was taken over by Hinrik Funhof, who in 1475 also married Bornemann's widow.

He was also the father of painter Hinrik Bornemann.

Further reading 
This article is a translation of the corresponding article on the German Wikipedia as of 30 January 2009

 Gmelin, Hans Georg. "Bornemann." In Grove Art Online. Oxford Art Online, (accessed February 3, 2012; subscription required).
 
 Helmut Reinecke, "Der Maler Hans Bornemann", in: Zeitschrift des deutschen Vereins für Kunstwissenschaft, Vol. 5, 1938, pp. 204–229
 Hans-Georg Gmelin, "Hans Bornemanns künstlerische Stellung und Nachwirkung in Nordwestdeutschland", in: Niederdeutsche Beiträge zur Kunstgeschichte, Vol. 8, 1969, pp. 109–146
 Stephan Kemperdick, "Zum Werk des Johannes Bornemann. Überlegungen zu Chronologie und Vorbildern", in: Niederdeutsche Beiträge zur Kunstgeschichte, Vol. 33, 1994, pp. 57–86

External links 
 
 Entry for Hans Bornemann on the Union List of Artist Names

Gothic painters
15th-century German painters
German male painters
1474 deaths
Painters from Hamburg
Year of birth unknown